The Balearic Islands are a province and autonomous community in Spain and lie in the Mediterranean Sea east of mainland Spain. They are divided into 67 municipalities - 53 on the island of Mallorca (Majorca), 8 on the island of Menorca (Minorca), 5 on the island of Eivissa (Ibiza) and 1 comprising the island of Formentera.

The municipalities are grouped into 9 comarques ("comarcas" in Castillian Spanish) - six on the island of Mallorca (Palma de Mallorca, Serra de Tramuntana, Raiguer, Pla de Mallorca, Migjorn and Llevant), while the other islands each form one comarque. In the table below, Serra de Tramuntana and Pla de Mallorca are abbreviated to "Serra" and "Pla" respectively.

The Catalan form is the sole official one. Older texts may use Castillian (Spanish) forms or spellings and where different these names are given in brackets after the Catalan name.

Municipalities

See also

Geography of Spain
List of Spanish cities

References

External links
All: List of Balearic municipalities (graphic; in Catalan)
Majorca: Llistat d'ajuntaments, entitats menors i mancomunitats de Mallorca (Consorci d'Informática Local de Mallorca) (in Catalan)
Menorca: Població i municipis (Consell insular de Menorca) (in Catalan)

Balearic Islands

Municipalities